Gonodontodes is a genus of moths of the family Noctuidae.

Species
Gonodontodes chionosticta Hampson, 1913
Gonodontodes dispar Hampson, 1913

References

Catocalinae